Kaspars Ozers (born 15 September 1968, in Tukums) is a former Latvian professional cyclist who had a brief professional career during the 1990s. He took part in the Tour de France twice, as a teammate of Lance Armstrong. In 1995 one of his teammates was Fabio Casartelli. Ozers had already left the Tour when Casartelli died. He also competed in the men's individual road race at the 1996 Summer Olympics.

Major results
1994
 1st Stage 2 Tour de l'Eurométropole
 1st Prologue Regio-Tour
 8th Overall Tour of Poland
1st Points classification
1995
 3rd Overall Danmark Rundt
1996
 4th Overall Danmark Rundt
 6th Druivenkoers-Overijse

References

Living people
Latvian male cyclists
1968 births
Cyclists at the 1996 Summer Olympics
Olympic cyclists of Latvia
People from Tukums